The wood duck or Carolina duck (Aix sponsa) is a species of perching duck found in North America. The drake wood duck is one of the most colorful North American waterfowl.

Description
The wood duck is a medium-sized perching duck. The wood duck's weight ranges from 454–862 g (16.0–30.4oz). This is about three-quarters the length of an adult mallard. It shares its genus with the Asian Mandarin duck (Aix galericulata).

The adult male has stunning multicolored iridescent plumage and red eyes, with a distinctive white flare down the neck. The female, less colorful, has a white eye-ring and a whitish throat. Both adults have crested heads. The speculum is iridescent blue–green with a white border on the trailing edge. 

The male's call is a rising whistle, jeeeeee; the females utter a drawn-out, rising squeal, do weep do weep, when flushed, and a sharp cr-r-ek, cr-e-ek for an alarm call.

Behavior
Their breeding habitat is wooded swamps, shallow lakes, marshes, ponds and creeks in the eastern United States, the west coast of the United States, some adjacent parts of southern Canada, and the west coast of Mexico. They usually nest in cavities in trees close to water, although they will take advantage of nesting boxes in wetland locations. Other species may compete with them for nesting cavities, such as birds of prey, as well as mammals such as grey squirrels, and these animals may also occupy nest boxes meant for wood ducks. Wood ducks may end up nesting up to a mile away from their water source as a result.  Females line their nests with feathers and other soft materials, and the elevation provides some protection from predators. Unlike most other ducks, the wood duck has sharp claws for perching in trees and can, in southern regions, produce two broods in a single seasonthe only North American duck that can do so.

Females typically lay seven to fifteen eggs which incubate for an average of thirty days. However, if nesting boxes are placed too close together, females may lay eggs in the nests of their neighbours, which may lead to nests with as many as thirty eggs and unsuccessful incubationa behaviour known as "nest dumping".

After hatching, the precocial ducklings climb to the opening of the nest cavity, jump down from the nest tree and make their way to water. The mother calls them to her, but does not help them in any way. The day after they hatch, the young climb to the nest entrance and jump to the ground. The ducklings can swim and find their own food by this time.

Wood ducks feed by dabbling (feeding from the surface rather than diving underwater) or grazing on land. They mainly eat berries, acorns, and seeds, but also insects, making them omnivores.

Distribution
The birds are year-round residents in parts of its southern range, but the northern populations migrate south for the winter. They overwinter in the southern United States near the Atlantic Coast. 75% of the wood ducks in the Pacific Flyway are non-migratory. Due to their attractive plumage, they are also popular in waterfowl collections and as such are frequently recorded in Great Britain as escapees—populations have become temporarily established in Surrey in the past, but are not considered to be self-sustaining in the fashion of the closely related mandarin duck. Along with the mandarin duck, the wood duck is considered an invasive species in England and Wales, and it is illegal to release them into the wild. Given its native distribution, the species is also a potential natural vagrant to Western Europe and there have been records in areas such as Cornwall, Scotland and the Isles of Scilly, which some observers consider may relate to wild birds; however, given the wood duck's popularity in captivity, it would be extremely difficult to prove their provenance. There is a small feral population in Dublin.

Conservation
The population of the wood duck was in serious decline in the late 19th century as a result of severe habitat loss and market hunting for both meat and plumage for the ladies' hat market in Europe. By the beginning of the 20th century, wood ducks had virtually disappeared from much of their former range. In response to the Migratory Bird Treaty established in 1916 and enactment of the U.S. Migratory Bird Treaty Act of 1918, wood duck populations began to recover slowly. By ending unregulated hunting and taking measures to protect remaining habitat, wood duck populations began to rebound in the 1920s. The development of the artificial nesting box in the 1930s gave an additional boost to wood duck production. More information on the efficacy of nest boxes can be found in the Conservation Evidence webpage. Wood duck boxes have been found to be less effective than natural, hollow, dead trees but remain overall beneficial for the population.

Landowners as well as park and refuge managers can encourage wood ducks by building wood duck nest boxes near lakes, ponds, and streams. Fulda, Minnesota, has adopted the wood duck as an unofficial mascot, and a large number of nest boxes can be found in the area.

Expanding North American beaver populations throughout the wood duck's range have also helped the population rebound as beavers create an ideal forested wetland habitat for wood ducks.

The population of the wood duck has increased a great deal in the last several years. The increase has been due to the work of many people constructing wood duck boxes and conserving vital habitat for the wood ducks to breed. During the open waterfowl season, U.S. hunters have been allowed to take only two wood ducks per day in the Atlantic and Mississippi Flyways. However, for the 2008–2009 season, the limit was raised to three. The wood duck limit remains at two in the Central Flyway and at seven in the Pacific Flyway. It is the second most commonly hunted duck in North America, after the mallard.

In popular culture
In 2013, the Royal Canadian Mint created two coins to commemorate the wood duck. The two coins are each part of a three coin set to help promote Ducks Unlimited Canada as well as celebrate its 75th anniversary. It is featured in James Thurber's short story "The Wood Duck".

Gallery

References

External links

Wood Duck Society

wood duck
wood duck
Birds of North America
Birds of Cuba
Birds of the Caribbean
wood duck
wood duck
Extant Pleistocene first appearances